The Christchurch Railway Cycleway follows the Main North railway in Christchurch. The route currently extends from Kilmarnock Street (Riccarton) in the south, through Fendalton and Papanui to Tuckers Road (Northcote) in the north. The northernmost section, from Northcote Road to Tuckers Road, was completed in early 2010.

Route

Existing path
The path follows the route of the Main North Line, which is operational. A description of the route can be found in a Christchurch City Council publication.

Despite its commonly used name, the pathway is a shared pedestrian/cycle facility. It connects a number of schools (e.g. Papanui High School, Waimairi School, Christchurch Girls' High School) and local shopping centres (Papanui, Strowan) and provides an off-road commuter connection from the northern suburbs to Riccarton and the central city.

Intersection control

The core section of the pathway (from Harewood Road to Matai Street) was constructed in the late 1990s / early 2000s. Of the five road crossings, three (Fendalton Road, Wairakei Road and Glandovey Road) were considered to require traffic signal control. One of the crossing points (Blighs Road) has since been retrofitted with traffic signals. The 2010 extension to Tuckers Road also included the creation of a signalised crossing at Northcote Road.

The signalised crossings feature bicycle detectors on the pathway well in advance of the intersections, so that riders receive a green signal as they arrive at the crossings.

Proposed path extensions
A pathway extension to the north (from Tuckers Road to Main North Road) is under design and was in the 2009–19 Long Term Plan prior to the Canterbury earthquakes. A feasibility study commissioned by Christchurch City Council also covered an extension to the suburb of Belfast, and possible links to the proposed Northern Arterial Highway Corridor.

South, there are plans in the next decade to continue the pathway along the railway line through Riccarton across Riccarton Road and on to Blenheim Road and the Christchurch railway station. Longer-term, the current city transport strategic plan envisages linking this corridor with others along the railway lines to the west and southeast.

References

External links
Christchurch City Council cycling website

Transport in Christchurch
Rail trails in New Zealand